Kay-Anlog is a component barangay of the city in Calamba, Laguna, Philippines, situated in the southern part of the city, adjacent to the barangays of Milagrosa, Burol, Bubuyan, and Ulango.

Geography 
Kay-Anlog is located at the southern edge of the city of Calamba, being one of the "upland barangays". At 272 hectares, it is one of the largest barangays by area in Calamba. It is a landlocked barangay bordered by Makiling and Milagrosa to the east, Ulango to the south, Punta to the north, Bubuyan and Burol to the west, Laurel, Batangas to the south. All of those districts are in Calamba, excluding barangay Laurel that is in Tanauan, Batangas.

Puroks 

Kay-Anlog is subdivided into 4 puroks (zones). These are:

Purok uno (zone one) or kanluran(west);
Purok dos (zone two) or gitna(middle);
Purok tres (zone three) or silangan(east) and;
Purok kwatro (zone four) or pasong diablo

History 

The namesake of the barangay is from Anlog, a man who is said to be the original resident of Buwisan and a former estate steward. He originally lived in Ulango, Tanauan, Batangas. The phrase "Kay Anlog" means "Anlog's property" as the area is named after him.

In the 1903 Philippine census, Buisan can be found as one of Calamba's barangays. It is said to be the former name of the barangay. In 1918 census, Quianlog appeared and Buisan disappeared from the census. This is due to changing of name of the barangay. Thru time, the barangay was eventually named Kay-Anlog.

Demographics

Population

In 1903 Census, the barangay was known as "Buisan". In 1918, it became "Quianlog" in 1948 it became "Buwisan" and on the following censuses it was named "Kay-Anlog".

Before 2010, Kay-Anlog was one of the barangays with the least population due to its remoteness especially from Calamba Poblacion. After the 2010 census, the population increased drastically due to government's housing projects in the barangay and became one of the most populous barangays in the city.

Religion
According to the 2015 Philippine census of the Philippine Statistics Authority, majority of the population of Kay-Anlog are Christian, with most being a part of the Roman Catholic Church at 89.33%. Other religions present in Kay-Anlog are Iglesia ni Cristo (3.97%), Jesus is Lord Church (0.57%), Church of Jesus Christ of Latter-day Saints (0.27%), Evangelicals (0.26%), Seventh Day Adventist (0.22%), Jesus is Alive Community Incorporated (0.14%), Islam (0.11%), Philippine Independent Church (0.10%), Jehovah's Witnesses (0.09%), and other Mainline Protestants.

Education
Kay-Anlog has two public elementary schools and a private elementary school, these are: Kay-Anlog Elementary School, Southville 6 Elementary School, and South Greenfields Academy of Learning Incorporated respectively. Despite one of the most populous barangays in Calamba, Kay-Anlog has no secondary school. The nearest secondary schools in Kay-Anlog are Punta Integrated School (public) and ACC Institute (private) both located in Punta.

Immanuel International Theological College is also located in Kay-Anlog.

Government

Just like any barangays in the Philippines, Kay-Anlog is headed by elected officials, the topmost being the Punong Barangay or the Barangay Chairperson (addressed as Kapitan; also known as the Barangay Captain). The Kapitan is aided by the Sangguniang Barangay (Barangay Council) whose members, called Barangay Kagawad ("Councilors"), are also elected.

Barangay Officials
In 14 May 2018, a barangay elections were held in all barangays of the country including Kay-Anlog. Originally scheduled for October 2016, these elections supposedly concluded the 2016 election cycle that started in May with the election of the Philippine president, the members of Philippine Congress and provincial, city and municipal officials. It was then postponed to October 2017, then was postponed further to May 2018. There were attempts to postpone it further, but Congress ran out of time to pass a law to postpone the elections further. Elections for the reformed Sangguniang Kabataan (SK; youth councils) will also be held at the same time. This shall be the first SK elections since 2010.

List of Barangay Chairmen of Kay-Anlog
Narciso Unico (1982–1989)
Basilio Panganiban (1989–2007)
Felipe Tercero (2007–2010)
Nestor Mendoza (2010–present)

Climate
Kay-Anlog has a tropical climate. There is significant rainfall in most months of the year. The short dry season has little effect on the overall climate. The climate here is classified as Am by the Köppen-Geiger system. The temperature here averages 26.4 °C. The average annual rainfall is 2021 mm.

See also
Kay-Anlog local elections, 2007

References

External links 
 http://www.msc.net.ph/calamba/agriculture.html
 https://web.archive.org/web/20070928041943/http://www.deped.gov.ph/public/public.asp?sec=&action=edit&iID=9989&type=public

Barangays of Calamba, Laguna